Daniel 'Dani' Gómez López (born 15 June 1992 in La Unión, Murcia) is a Spanish footballer who, since 2014, plays for CD Olímpic de Xàtiva as a forward.

Football career
A product of local FC Cartagena's youth system, Gómez made senior debuts with the farm team in the 2010–11 season, in Tercera División. On 15 January 2011 he appeared in his first game as a professional, playing the last 17 minutes in a 1–3 away loss against Rayo Vallecano in the Segunda División championship.

On 5 August 2011 López was loaned to Orihuela CF, in Segunda División B. The following summer he rescinded his contract with Cartagena, and signed with Getafe CF B; six months later, however, after being rarely played by the Madrid outskirts club, he moved to another reserve team, Real Zaragoza B.

On 13 July 2013 Gómez signed with Coruxo FC, also in the third level. In January of the following year he rescinded his link, and moved to fellow league side CD Olímpic de Xàtiva.

References

External links

1992 births
Living people
Spanish footballers
Footballers from the Region of Murcia
Association football forwards
Segunda División players
Segunda División B players
Tercera División players
FC Cartagena footballers
Orihuela CF players
Getafe CF B players
Real Zaragoza B players
Coruxo FC players
CD Olímpic de Xàtiva footballers